Cliostomum spribillei is a species of corticolous (bark-dwelling) crustose lichen in the family Ramalinaceae. It is found in the American Pacific Northwest and western Canada, where it grows on coniferous trees in old-growth forests. The lichen was formally described as a new species in 2016 by Trevor Goward and Tor Tønsberg. The species epithet spribillei honors lichenologist Toby Spribille "for his many significant contributions to our knowledge of northwest North American lichens".

The main characteristics of Cliostomum spribillei that distinguish it from others in genus Cliostomum are its yellowish-green, granular-sorediate thallus, and the presence of usnic acid as its sole lichen product.

References

Ramalinaceae
Lichen species
Lichens described in 2016
Lichens of Canada
Lichens of the United States